Alison Ann Sweeney (born September 19, 1976) is an American actress, reality show host, director and author. Sweeney is best known for her portrayal of Samantha "Sami" Brady on the NBC soap opera Days of Our Lives, a role she played under contract with the show from January 6, 1993 to October 30, 2014. In this role, she earned a Daytime Emmy Award nomination, four Soap Opera Digest Awards and a Fan Voted Daytime Emmy Award. After making sporadic appearances since then, she returned as a series regular in 2021. In 2007, she became the host of The Biggest Loser in its fourth season, and left the series at the end of the 16th season in 2015.

Personal life 
Sweeney is of Irish descent and has two brothers. She studied economics at UCLA but left due to her commitment to Days of Our Lives. On July 8, 2000, Sweeney married David Sanov, after dating for nearly three years. The couple have two children: a son born on February 25, 2005, and a daughter born on January 12, 2009. The family currently lives in Los Angeles.

Career 

Sweeney's television debut was at age five in a Kodak advertisement. A few years later, she was in the episode "I Can't Help Saying Goodbye" of the horror series Tales from the Darkside, playing a young girl who could sense when others were going to die shortly before their deaths. In 1988, she appeared on the short-lived ABC sitcom Family Man, and the following year, was cast as Christy McCray on Brand New Life, a miniseries from future X-Files creator Chris Carter that aired within NBC's Magical World of Disney in October 1989. The miniseries, which co-starred Barbara Eden as Sweeney's mother and Don Murray as her new stepfather, was considered for pick-up as a stand-alone series beyond its Disney tryout, but the regular series never materialized.

On January 6, 1993, then 16-year-old Sweeney first appeared in the role of Samantha "Sami" Brady in the NBC soap opera Days of Our Lives—a show of which she was a fan.

In the 1990s, cultural society continued to have very problematic views on weight. Sweeney was a US dress size 12 (UK dress size 16), not obese by medical standards, but still larger than her television peers, so it became an issue. She documented all the tabloid talk and personal anguish in her 2004 memoir, All The Days of My Life (So Far).

In 2002, she appeared on a celebrity episode of the NBC reality game show Fear Factor. She has appeared in other NBC shows such as Friends, where she played an actress on Days of Our Lives, and Las Vegas. In 2007, she joined the Jerry Lewis MDA Telethon as a co-host for the live television broadcast. She returned to her co-hosting duties for the 2008, 2009, and 2010 telethons.

In 2007, Sweeney took over hosting duties on The Biggest Loser, replacing Caroline Rhea since the fourth season. She was surprised but happy to be offered the role, where she is able to cheer on contestants and share their victories.

Sweeney has written four books: All The Days of My Life (So Far) (released in May 2004), The Star Attraction (released in May 2013), Scared Scriptless: A Novel (released in June 2014) and Opportunity Knocks (released in April 2016).

In July 2013, Sweeney appeared in Second Chances, a Hallmark Original Movie, alongside Days co-star Greg Vaughan. The movie was filmed before Sweeney and Vaughn became siblings on Days of Our Lives.

On January 20, 2014, Sweeney announced on The Ellen DeGeneres Show that after 21 years of being on the air on Days of Our Lives, she was leaving the show, to focus on spending more time with her family, and to work on her other show, The Biggest Loser. She stated in the interview that she would be on the show throughout 2014, and that she would like her character on the show to have a happy ending with a Breaking Bad twist.

On July 9, 2014, it was announced that Sweeney would be joining General Hospital behind the scenes as a director, starting later that month. On April 26, 2015, Sweeney announced that she will be returning to Days of Our Lives to be part of the show's 50th anniversary celebrations.

From 2015 to 2017, Sweeney has appeared in the Hallmark Movies & Mysteries film series Murder, She Baked,  based on Joanne Fluke's books.

On August 25, 2015, it was announced that Sweeney would not be returning to The Biggest Loser.

Beginning on October 13, 2017, Sweeney reprised her long-term role as Sami Brady on Days of Our Lives, over 24 years after her first appearance as a teenaged Sami Brady.

She was most recently seen playing podcast host Alex McPherson in Hallmark Movies & Mysteries film series Chronicle Mysteries, which started in 2019, with a fifth movie in 2021.

Filmography

Awards and nominations

References

External links 

 
 

1976 births
American child actresses
American soap opera actresses
American television actresses
Living people
Actresses from Los Angeles
20th-century American actresses
21st-century American actresses
University of California, Los Angeles alumni
American television hosts
Days of Our Lives
The Biggest Loser
American women television presenters